Jam Ali Akber (Urdu) شهزاده جام علي اكبر خان  belongs to the Lasbela royal house and is the former Provincial Minister of Balochistan Province. He has been a member of the Provincial Assembly of Balochistan twice.

See also 
 Jam Ghulam Qadir Khan
 Las Bela (princely state)
 Jam family of Lasbela

References
Lasbela District Government

Living people
Members of the Provincial Assembly of Balochistan
Jamote people
Jams of Lasbela
Nawabs of Pakistan
People from Lasbela District
Princely rulers of Pakistan
Year of birth missing (living people)